The  mraW RNA motif is a conserved, structured RNA found in certain bacteria.  Specifically, it is predicted in many, though not all, species of actinobacteria, and especially within the genus Mycobacterium.  Structurally, the motif consists of a hairpin with a highly conserved terminal loop sequence (red nucleotides in diagram at right).  mraW RNAs are consistently in the presumed 5' untranslated regions of mraW genes.  These mraW genes likely form operons with immediately downstream ftsI genes, and multiple types of mur genes.  These genes are associated with peptidoglycan synthesis, and it was hypothesized that the mraW RNA motif might regulate these genes.

References

External links
 

Cis-regulatory RNA elements